David Alan Jackson (born June 3, 1964) is an American professional golfer and former PGA Tour member.

Jackson was born in Valdosta, Georgia.  He attended the University of Florida in Gainesville, Florida, where he played for the Florida Gators men's golf team in National Collegiate Athletic Association (NCAA) competition from 1983 to 1986.  During his college career, he was a two-time individual medalist, the Gators won the Southeastern Conference (SEC) team championship in 1985, and he was a first-team All-SEC selection three times (1984, 1985, 1986).  Jackson also received All-American honors four times.  He graduated from the university with a bachelor's degree in exercise and sport science in 1986.

Jackson played on the PGA Tour and its development tour, the Ben Hogan Tour/Nike Tour (now Web.com Tour), from 1989 to 1998. On the PGA Tour (1989, 1993), his best finish was T-14 at the 1986 Tallahassee Open. On the Ben Hogan/Nike Tour (1990–92, 1994–98), his best finish was a win at the 1992 Ben Hogan Cleveland Open.

Professional wins (1)

Ben Hogan Tour wins (1)

Ben Hogan Tour playoff record (0–1)

Results in major championships

CUT = missed the halfway cut
Note: Jackson only played in the U.S. Open.

See also
1988 PGA Tour Qualifying School graduates
1992 Ben Hogan Tour graduates
List of Florida Gators men's golfers on the PGA Tour
List of University of Florida alumni

References

External links

American male golfers
Florida Gators men's golfers
PGA Tour golfers
Korn Ferry Tour graduates
Golfers from Georgia (U.S. state)
People from Valdosta, Georgia
1964 births
Living people